Bamiyan may refer to:

 Bamiyan Province, Afghanistan 
 Bamiyan, the capital of Bamiyan Province
 The Buddhas of Bamyan, ancient gigantic statues, now destroyed